The Ministry of Religious Affairs is a ministry responsible for monitoring religious affairs in Somalia, including both the national religion and minority religions. The current Minister of Religious Affairs is Mukhtar Robow.

See also
 Agriculture in Somalia

References

Government ministries of Somalia